Lê Chân Tông (黎真宗, 1630 – 2 October 1649) was the 18th monarch of Vietnamese Later Lê dynasty.

Biography
Lê Chân Tông's birth name is Lê Duy Hựu (黎維祐), courtesy name Duy Đề (維禔). He was born in 1630 and reigned from 1643 to 1649, interrupting the reign of his father Lê Thần Tông who reigned 1619–1643 and again 1649–1662. He was a figurehead king under the power of lord Trịnh Tráng who ruled 1623–1657.

Family
Consorts and their respective issues:
 Queen Trịnh Thị (芳慈皇后鄭氏)

References

1630 births
1649 deaths
C
Vietnamese monarchs